KMMT (106.5 FM) is a radio station broadcasting a Modern rock format, licensed to Mammoth Lakes, California. The station can be heard in Fresno, California.

External links
KMMT website

MMT
Contemporary hit radio stations in the United States